Angar Garia (also spelled Angargoria) is a village and gram panchayat in Mohammad Bazar CD Block in Suri Sadar subdivision of Birbhum district.

Geography

CD block HQ
The headquarters of Mohammad Bazar CD block are located at Angar Garia.

Demographics
As per the 2011 Census of India, Angar Garia had a total population of 4,232 of which 2,155 (51%) were males and 2,077 (49%) were females. Population below 6 years was 487. The total number of literates in Angar Garia was 2,631 (70.25% of the population over 6 years).

Economy
China clay mines are found in Kharia, Mocdam Nagar, Komarpur, Angargoria and Mohammad Bazar, in Birbhum district. Mining is carried out mainly by the open cast method.

Transport
SH 11, running from Mohammad Bazar and to Ranaghat, passes through Angar Garia.

References

Villages in Birbhum district